Unholy Cult is the fifth album by death metal band Immolation. It was released on Listenable Records in 2002. It is the band's last album to feature Alex Hernandez behind the drum kit. The album was inducted into Decibels Hall of Fame.

Track listing
 All songs written by Ross Dolan and Robert Vigna.

Personnel
Immolation
Ross Dolan – bass, vocals
Bill Taylor – guitar
Robert Vigna – guitar
Alex Hernandez – drums

Production
Andreas Marschall – Cover artwork
Paul Orofino – Engineering, Mastering, Producer
Jeff Wolfe – Band photography
Sven – Additional layout

References

2002 albums
Immolation (band) albums
Listenable Records albums